Brunia is a genus of shrubs of the family Bruniaceae, native to the cape region of South Africa.

Taxonomy
The genus was described by Carl Linnaeus and published in Species Plantarum 1: 199 in the year 1753. The type species is Brunia paleacea P.J.Bergius, Descriptiones Plantarum ex Capite Bonae Spei, 56. (1767)

The name Brunia is thought to have been derived from the apothecary, Dr Cornelis Brun, who travelled in Russia and the Levant, although it could also be in commemoration of Dr Alexander Brown, a ship's surgeon and a collector who worked in the East Indies around 1690.

Species

Brunia africana Burm.f.
Brunia angulata
Brunia barnardii
Brunia bullata
Brunia callunoides
Brunia compacta
Brunia cordata
Brunia dregeana
Brunia esterhuyseniae
Brunia fragarioides
Brunia laevis
Brunia latebracteata
Brunia macrocephala
Brunia microphylla
Brunia monogyna
Brunia monostyla
Brunia myrtoides
Brunia neglecta
Brunia nodiflora
Brunia noduliflora Goldblatt & J.C.Manning, cone stompie
Brunia oblongifolia
Brunia paleacea
Brunia palustris
Brunia pentandra
Brunia phylicoides
Brunia pillansii
Brunia powrieae
Brunia purpurea
Brunia sacculata
Brunia schlecteri
Brunia sphaerocephala
Brunia squalida
Brunia thomae
Brunia trigyna
Brunia tulbaghensis
Brunia variabilis
Brunia villosa
Brunia virgata

The genus is accepted by United States Department of Agriculture and the Agricultural Research Service, but they only accept Brunia albiflora, Brunia lanuginosa,Brunia nodiflora, Brunia noduliflora, Brunia paleacea and Brunia stokoei. Kew accepts the above species except Brunia nodiflora.

References

Other sources
 Lamarck, J-B. 1785. Encyclopédie Méthodique, Botanique 1(2): 474

Bruniaceae
Flora of the Cape Provinces
Flora of KwaZulu-Natal
Asterid genera